Yu-Gi-Oh! VRAINS is the sixth main anime series in the Yu-Gi-Oh! franchise and the ninth anime series overall. It is  produced by Gallop and broadcast by TV Tokyo. The series is directed by Masahiro Hosoda. The series follows Yusaku Fujiki. It takes place in a high school environment in Den City. The series features Charisma Duelists who use VR and are similar to real life YouTubers. The show's theme is "Let's take one step forward and try it!"

The series uses 8 pieces of theme music, including three opening themes and five ending themes. From episodes 25–46, the second ending theme is "Writing Life" by Goodbye Holiday. From episodes 47–70, the third ending theme is "BOY" by uchuu.

In Canada, the English dub of the series began airing on Teletoon on September 1, 2018. It later began airing in Australia on 9Go! on April 6, 2019. In the United States, the dubbed episodes started airing on The Toon Blast Saturday Morning block on November 7, 2020. Like previous dubs, the English adaptation incorporates its own theme music.

Series overview

Episode list

Season 1 (2017–18)

Season 2 (2018–19)

Season 3 (2019)

Notes

References

VRAINS
Yu-Gi-Oh! VRAINS